

On November 26, 2006, radio host Jerry Klein of WMAL 630 AM (covering Washington DC, Northern Virginia and Maryland) had a program that was "focused on public reaction to the removal of six imams, or Islamic religious leaders, from a US Airways flight." (See Flying Imams controversy). In an effort to gauge his audience's reaction, he said that force should be applied to ensure that all Muslims in America wear "identifying markers. ...I'm thinking either it should be an arm band, a crescent moon arm band, or it should be a crescent moon tattoo. ...If it means that we have to round them up and do a tattoo in a place where everybody knows where to find it, then that's what we'll have to do."

The response was overwhelming and "the phone lines jammed instantly". Klein later stated that "The switchboard went from empty to totally jammed within minutes. There were plenty of callers angry with me, but there were plenty who agreed." While some callers said he was "off his rocker", others insisted that his statement did not go far enough, calling for forced mass exile: "Not only do you tattoo them in the middle of their forehead but you ship them out of this country... they are here to kill us." Others called for Muslims to be placed in internment camps: "You have to set up encampments like during World War Two with the Japanese and Germans."

At the end of the program, Klein revealed that his remarks had been a hoax, saying, "I can't believe any of you are sick enough to have agreed for one second with anything I said. For me to suggest to tattoo marks on people's bodies, have them wear armbands, put a crescent moon on their driver's license on their passport or birth certificate is disgusting. It's beyond disgusting ... because basically what you just did was show me how the German people allowed what happened to the Jews to happen ... We need to separate them, we need to tattoo their arms, we need to make them wear the yellow Star of David, we need to put them in concentration camps, we basically just need to kill them all because they are dangerous." A week later, Klein also expressed surprise at how much international media coverage the story got. "You should know that I've received email from around the world, interview requests from the BBC and Channel 4 in England".

A Gallup poll the preceding summer had found that 39% of Americans were in favor of requiring Muslims, including those who were citizens, to bear special identification identifying them as such.

See also

Islamophobia
Incitement to violence
Internment of Japanese Americans
Internment of German Americans

References

External links
 Recording of the program from WMAL, archived by the Wayback Machine (mp3)

Islam-related controversies in North America
Radio program episodes
2000s American radio programs
2006 hoaxes
Performance hoaxes
Hoaxes in the United States
2006 in radio
Race-related controversies in radio
Religious controversies in radio